Ninilchik School is a K-12 school in Ninilchik, Alaska, serving the communities of Ninilchik, Anchor Point, Kasilof, and Clam Gulch. It is the oldest school on the Kenai Peninsula, originally opened in 1910. The principal is Terry Martin. In 2010 the school celebrated its centennial year with a community gathering and pig roast.

Sports
The school is home to the highly successful Ninilchik Lady Wolverine basketball team  of Ninilchik High School, which plays in District III, Region II. Owners of 8 state championships, the Lady Wolverines are recognized as one of the most successful basketball programs in the state.

References

External links
 Official website
 Alaska School Activities Association

Basketball teams in Alaska
Schools in Kenai Peninsula Borough, Alaska
Educational institutions established in 1910
Public K-12 schools in Alaska
1910 establishments in Alaska